Nikolay Arefiev (born 11 March 1949, Yakutsk) is a Russian political figure and a deputy of the 8th State Duma.
 
From 1968 to 1970, he served at the Soviet Armed Forces. In 1979, he became a member of the Communist Party of the Soviet Union. From 1981 to 1985, he was an instructor, then head of a department of one of the district committees of the CPSU in Astrakhan. From 1987 to 1991, he was the first secretary of the Soviet district committee of the CPSU in Astrakhan. In 1993, he was appointed Secretary of the Astrakhan Regional Committee of the Communist Party of the Russian Federation. From 1995 to 1999, he was the deputy of the 2nd State Duma. From 1997 to 2010, he was the First Secretary of the Astrakhan Regional Committee of the Communist Party. In 1999 and 2003, he was re-elected for the 3rd State Duma. From 2006 to 2010, he was the deputy of the Duma of Astrakhan Oblast. In 2011, 2016, and 2021, he was re-elected for the 6th, 7th, and 8th State Dumas.

References
 

 

1949 births
Living people
Communist Party of the Russian Federation members
21st-century Russian politicians
Eighth convocation members of the State Duma (Russian Federation)
People from Astrakhan Oblast